FK Krajina can refer to:

FK Krajina Cazin
FK Krajina Banja Luka